Ulaşlı is a village in the Oğuzeli District, Gaziantep Province, Turkey. The village is inhabited by Turkicized Arabs of the Damalha tribe.

References

Villages in Oğuzeli District